The Royal Hospital for Sick Children was a hospital in  Edinburgh, Scotland, specialising in paediatric healthcare. Locally, it was commonly referred to simply as the "Sick Kids". The hospital provided emergency care for children from birth to their 13th birthday, including a specialist Accident and Emergency facility. Some in-patient specialties saw children up to their 16th birthday. The hospital was located on Sciennes Road in the Sciennes area of Edinburgh's South Side and was managed by NHS Lothian. It moved in 2021 to the new Royal Hospital for Children and Young People in Little France.

History

The hospital, which opened at 7 Lauriston Lane in 1860, was the first dedicated children's hospital in Scotland. It received a royal charter in 1863, when it moved to the Meadowside House. The conversion of the house into a hospital was carried out by the architect David Macgibbon. In 1890 an outbreak of typhoid forced a temporary removal to Plewlands House, Morningside, and Meadowside House was subsequently sold.

The site of the Trades Maiden Hospital (established by Mary Erskine) at Rillbank was bought in the early 1890s, and plans for a new hospital were put in hand to designs by George Washington Browne. The Sciennes Road building, which cost £50,000, was opened by Princess Beatrice on 31 October 1895.

The hospital joined the National Health Service in 1948. The First Minister, Nicola Sturgeon, visited it in November 2014.

In February 2015 construction work began on the Royal Hospital for Children and Young People at Little France, which replaced the hospital in 2021.

In December 2016 the existing site was offered for sale as a development opportunity with the expectation of significant interest. In September 2017 NHS Lothian decided to sell the site to the Downing Group, a Liverpool-based property developer.

The Royal Hospital for Sick Children closed on 23 March 2021. The Downing Group started work on the redevelopment of the site in June 2021.

Fundraising
In 2011, 6-year old Jack Henderson started an initiative to raise money for the hospital that cared for his brother, by selling drawings he had created. He originally planned to raise £100, but quickly raised £10,000. A book, Jack Draws Anything, was published in October 2011. After 3 years the fundraising total exceeded £64,000 and the project was brought to an end in June 2014.

Architecture of the Sciennes Site 

Some of the buildings that make up the hospital at the Sciennes Road site have listed building status designated by Historic Environment Scotland. 
 The main George Washington Browne building is designated as category B. 
 The mortuary chapel (also by Washington Browne) is designated as category A as it contains a mural scheme by the Arts and Crafts artist Phoebe Anna Traquair.

References

External links
 Royal Hospital for Sick Children, NHS Lothian web site

Hospitals in Edinburgh
Hospital buildings completed in 1863
Defunct hospitals in Scotland
Children's hospitals in the United Kingdom
Category B listed buildings in Edinburgh
Listed hospital buildings in Scotland
NHS Lothian
1860 establishments in Scotland
Hospitals established in 1860
Organisations based in Edinburgh with royal patronage
Childhood in Scotland